The Battle of Zenta, also known as the Battle of Senta, was fought on 11 September 1697, near Zenta, Ottoman Empire (modern-day Senta, Serbia), between Ottoman and Holy League armies during the Great Turkish War. The battle was the most decisive engagement of the war, and it saw the Ottomans suffer an overwhelming defeat by an Imperial force half as large sent by Emperor Leopold I.

In 1697 a last major Turkish attempt to conquer Hungary was made; sultan Mustafa II personally led the invasion force. In a surprise attack, Habsburg Imperial forces commanded by Prince Eugene of Savoy engaged the Turkish army while it was halfway through crossing the Tisza river at Zenta, 80 miles northwest of Belgrade. The Habsburg forces inflicted thousands of casualties, including the Grand Vizier, dispersed the remainder, captured the Ottoman treasury, and came away with such emblems of high Ottoman authority as the Seal of the Empire which had never been captured before. The European coalition's losses, on the other hand, were exceptionally light.

As an immediate consequence, the Ottoman Empire lost control over the Banat. Eugene followed up this great victory by raiding deep into Ottoman Bosnia. The scale of the defeat forced the Ottoman Empire into the Treaty of Karlowitz (1699) ceding Croatia, Hungary, Transylvania and Slavonia to Austria. Zenta was one of the Ottoman Empire's greatest defeats and ultimately signalled the end of Ottoman dominance in Europe.

Prelude
After the Battle of Vienna of 1683, a turning point seemed to have been reached in the Ottoman–Habsburg wars, with Austria and its allies capturing more Ottoman lands. By 1688 Belgrade and most of the Pannonian Plain was occupied by the Habsburgs. But as the war with the French demanded more troops, and the new grand vizier reorganised and reinvigorated the Ottoman Army, the success ended. Belgrade was recaptured by the Ottomans in 1690 and the following year's campaign was relatively indecisive after the Habsburg army failed in the second siege of Belgrade (1694). Subsequently, the Ottoman army commanded by Sultan Mustafa II won three consecutive victories at the Battle of Lugos (1695), Battle of Ulaş (1696), and Battle of Cenei (1696) while the Venetians lost Chios (1695).

On 18 April 1697, Mustafa embarked upon his third expedition, planning a massive invasion of Hungary. He left Edirne with a force of 100,000 men. The Sultan took personal command, reaching Belgrade late in the Summer, on 11 August. Mustafa gathered a war council the next day. On 18 August the Ottomans left Belgrade heading north towards Szeged.

Battle

Opening manoeuvres

On 5 July, in the newly conquered Pannonian Plain of Hungary, Prince Eugene of Savoy, a young French prince who had distinguished himself greatly in battle, was appointed Commander-in-Chief by Emperor Leopold. His army consisted of 70,000 men with roughly 35,000 ready for battle. As the war chest was empty, Eugene borrowed money in order to pay wages and to create a working medical service. He requested that rations, ammunition and equipment be brought up to the level of an army of 50,000.
When news arrived that the Sultan and his army had left Belgrade, Eugene decided to gather all his available troops from Upper Hungary and Transylvania and force march them towards Petrovaradin, on the Danube, upriver from Belgrade. Prince Eugene sent some troops north to Hegyalja to deal with Hungarian rebels while he worked on rebuilding the remainder of the army to face the Turks. After the concentration was completed, Eugene's forces numbered about fifty thousand to face the Ottomans.

The Habsburg army consisted of German, Austrian, Hungarian and Serbian infantry and cavalry forces. Palatine Paul Eszterházy of the Habsburg Kingdom of Hungary contributed 12,000 soldiers; the Serbian Militia, 10,000 men, a majority of whom were cavalry, under the command of Jovan Popović Tekelija, also joined Eugene's forces. Serb conscripts were part of the coalition, notably Vice-Voivode Jovan Monasterlija with his 1,000 infantry and 700 cavalry soldiers.

Despite the advice of the warden of Belgrade, Amcazade Hüseyin Pasha, who proposed attacking Habsburg-held Petrovaradin northwest of Belgrade on the Danube River, Mustafa moved towards Transylvania.
The Ottoman army counted on Hungarian Kuruc cavalry under the leadership of Imre Thököly, however many former Kuruc rebels had also joined the Holy League and the call for a crusade.

The Sultan and his army crossed the Danube, then made a detour west to capture Titel Castle at the confluence of the Tisza and the Danube. Finding the castle without a garrison, the Ottomans demolished it. In September, they headed north, along the right bank of the Tisza reaching the vicinity of the village of Zenta on the morning of 11 September. The river Tisza was the last major river barrier before Transylvania. Prince Eugene followed, marching the Imperial army south from Petrovaradin, crossed the Tisza river and headed upriver along the east bank. The Ottomans had no idea where the enemy was.

Ambush

On 11 September, the Ottoman army began to ford the river Tisza near Zenta, unaware that the Imperial Army was nearby. Captain Jovan Popović Tekelija, commander of the Serbian Militia, who was monitoring the advances of the Ottomans, immediately informed Prince Eugene, and a captured Ottoman pasha was forced to confirm the information. Tekelija then led the Imperial army over swamps and bog to the rear of the Turks encampment. 
A courier arrived from Vienna carrying peremptory orders from the emperor to "act with extreme caution" and not risk a general engagement, but not wanting to let the Turks slip across the river under cover of night, Eugene decided to carry on with his plan.

Two hours before sunset, the arrival of the Habsburg army, after a ten-hour forced march, shocked the Ottoman forces as they were still in the process of crossing the river and did not think that the Christian army could get there so quickly. Sultan Mustafa, his baggage, and the artillery were on the Temeşvar bank while most of the infantry was still with the Grand Vizier on the other bank.

As the light began to fall the entire Habsburg force, with cavalry on each side and the infantry in the middle, launched an all-out assault from the rear, attacking in a crescent shape movement against the defensive position of the Ottomans. The left flank of the Imperial army commanded by General Guido Starhemberg penetrated between the Ottoman left and the bridge, trapping them against the river. The army's right wing was under the command of General Sigbert Heister. At the same time, Imperial forces led by Charles-Thomas de Vaudémont, attacked from the front and, after engaging in close-quarter fighting, broke through the trenches surrounding the Ottoman camp. The command of the Turkish cavalry was under Hungarian Imre Thököly, who also supported the sultan with some additional Kuruc cavalry.

The Imperial Dragoon of General Starhemberg dismounted and proceeded to the moat encircling and engaging the Ottoman camp and soon broke through the Turkish line of defence. Ottoman troops behind the entrenchments retreated in confusion to the bridge, which was now overcrowded, heavily bombarded, and soon collapsed.

Thrown into disorder, the trapped Ottoman troops fell into chaos with thousands falling into the river. Austrian artillery devastated the surviving Ottomans as they tried to escape. The Sultan watched helplessly from the other side, before he decided, after ordering the remaining troops to secure the bridge, to abandon his army and retreat. Escorted by a cavalry detachment and accompanied by his tutor and mentor Sheikh-ul-Islam Feyzullah Efendi, Mustafa set off for Temeşvar, without stopping along the way, taking only what horses could carry. When the Habsburg army reached the far bank they found that the sultan had left behind him 87 cannon, 9000 baggage carts, 6000 camels and 15,000 oxen. In addition, the Austrians found the Ottoman royal treasure chest, containing three million piastres and the state seal of Grand Sultan Mustafa II of the Ottoman Empire which had never been captured by an enemy before. The seal was inscribed with the words "Mustafa, son of Mehmed Han, always victorious" and the year of his accession to the throne "1106 of the Hejra" (1695 according to the Christian calendar). After the victory, Prince Eugene personally presented the emperor with the pieces that were captured at the Battle of Zenta.

In total 30,000 Turks died, including many of the most senior figures in the Ottoman military-administrative establishment; the grand vizier was murdered on the battlefield by mutinous Janissaries. In contrast, the Holy League suffered only 429 casualties. The great difference in casualties was partly due to the tactical superiority of the imperial army and cannon technology which, unlike the Ottomans, the Austrians had improved to a great extent.

Aftermath

The battle resulted in a spectacular victory for Austria. The main Ottoman army was scattered and the Austrians gained complete freedom of action in Ottoman Bosnia. On 22 October after Eugene mounted a raid with six thousand cavalry including Serbian Militia of the Sava, Sarajevo was captured; after the Turks killed the messengers sent to ask them to surrender, the city was plundered and burned to the ground.

After fourteen years of war, the battle at Zenta proved to be the catalyst for peace; within months mediators of both sides started peace negotiations in Sremski Karlovci under the supervision of English ambassador to Constantinople, William Paget. By the terms of the Treaty of Karlowitz, signed near Belgrade on 26 January 1699, Austria gained control of Hungary (except for the Banat of Temesvár and a small area of Eastern Slavonia), Transylvania, Croatia and Slavonia. A portion of the returned territories were reintegrated into the Kingdom of Hungary; the rest were organised as separate entities within the Habsburg monarchy, such as the Principality of Transylvania and the Military Frontier. The Turks kept Belgrade and Serbia, the Sava became the northernmost limit of the Ottoman Empire and Bosnia a border province. The victory ultimately formalised the complete withdrawal of the Turks from Hungary and signalled the end of Ottoman dominance in Europe.

Images

See also
 Ottoman wars in Europe

Notes

References

Citations

Bibliography

Journals

Websites

External links
 
 

1697 in Europe
1690s in the Ottoman Empire
17th century in Serbia
Battles involving Austria
Battles involving Hungary
Battles involving Habsburg Croatia
Battles involving the Ottoman Empire
Battles of the Great Turkish War
Conflicts in 1697
History of Bačka
Ottoman Serbia
Ottoman history of Vojvodina
Vojvodina under Habsburg rule
Senta
Battles involving Serbian Militia